Darb-e Emamzadeh Ebrahim (also Romanized as Darb-e Emāmzādeh Ebrāhīm; also known as Darb-e Emāmzādeh) is a village in Kenarrudkhaneh Rural District, in the Central District of Golpayegan County, Isfahan Province, Iran. At the 2006 census, its population was 684, in 200 families.

References 

Populated places in Golpayegan County